Phalachthia, also Phalachthia in Phthiotis (Φαλαχθία Φθιώτιδος), was a town of Oetaea in ancient Thessaly.

Its location is unknown.

References

Populated places in ancient Thessaly
Former populated places in Greece
Oetaea
Lost ancient cities and towns